Kocher's point is a common entry point through the frontal bone for an intraventricular catheter to drain cerebrospinal fluid from the anterior horn of the lateral ventricle. It is located 2–3 centimeters lateral to the midline (at approximately the mid-pupillary line) and approximately 11 cm posterior to the nasion, or 10 cm posterior from the glabella. During cannulation of the lateral ventricle, Kocher's point is landmarked as a point of entry, and care must be taken to be at least 1 cm anterior to the coronal suture to avoid damaging the primary motor cortex. It is most often used to remove cerebrospinal fluid for the treatment of hydrocephalus.

See also
 Ventriculostomy

References

Human head and neck
Neurosurgery